Brookfield Township may refer to:
 Brookfield Township, LaSalle County, Illinois
 Brookfield Township, Clinton County, Iowa
 Brookfield Township, Worth County, Iowa
 Brookfield Township, Eaton County, Michigan
 Brookfield Township, Huron County, Michigan
 Brookfield Township, Minnesota
 Brookfield Township, Linn County, Missouri, in Linn County, Missouri
 Brookfield Township, Noble County, Ohio
 Brookfield Township, Trumbull County, Ohio
 Brookfield Township, Tioga County, Pennsylvania
 Brookfield Township, McCook County, South Dakota, in McCook County, South Dakota

Township name disambiguation pages